Makaton is a communication tool together with speech and symbols, to enable people with disabilities or learning disabilities to communicate. It is not a British Sign Language (BSL) or any form of Sign Language in its own right. Makaton supports the development of essential communication skills such as attention, listening, comprehension, memory and expressive speech and language. The Makaton language programme has been used with individuals who have cognitive impairments, autism, Down's Syndrome, specific language impairment, multisensory impairment and acquired neurological disorders that have negatively affected the ability to communicate, including stroke and dementia patients.

The name "Makaton" is derived from the first letters of three members of the initial teaching team at Botleys Park Hospital, Margaret Walker (the designer of the programme and Speech Therapist at Botleys Park), Katherine Johnston and Tony Cornforth (Psychiatric Hospital Visitors from the Royal Association for Deaf people.)

Makaton is a registered trade mark of The Makaton Charity, which was established in 2007 and replaced the original Charitable Trust, the Makaton Vocabulary Development Project (MVDP) which was established in 1983. The original trademark application for Makaton was filed in the UK on 28 August 1979, with registration approved as from that date under UK trade mark registration no. 1119745.

In 2004 the Oxford University Press included Makaton as a common usage word in the Oxford English Dictionary. The entry states "Makaton, n. Brit. A proprietary name for: a language programme integrating speech, manual signs, and graphic symbols, developed to help people for whom communication is very difficult, esp. those with learning disabilities."

Programme
The Makaton Language Programme uses a multimodal approach to teach communication, language and, where appropriate literacy skills, through a combination of speech, signs, and graphic symbols used concurrently, or, only with speech with signs, or, only with speech with graphic symbols as appropriate for the student's needs. It consists of a Core Vocabulary of roughly 450 concepts that are taught in a specific order (there are 8 different stages). For example, stage 1 involves teaching vocabulary for immediate needs, like "eat" and "drink".  Later stages contain more complex and abstract vocabulary such as time and emotions.  Once basic communication has been established, the student can progress in their language use, using whatever modes are most appropriate. Also, although the programme is organised in stages, it can be modified and tailored to the individual's needs. In addition to the Core Vocabulary, there is a Makaton Resource Vocabulary of over 11,000 concepts which are illustrated with signs and graphic symbols.

Development
Original research was conducted by  Margaret Walker in 1972/73, and resulted in the design of the Makaton Core Vocabulary based on functional need. This research was conducted with institutionalised deaf cognitively impaired adults resident at Botleys Park Hospital in Chertsey, Surrey (which closed in 2008). The aim was to enable them to communicate using signs from British Sign Language. Fourteen deaf and cognitively impaired adults participated in the pilot study, and all were able to learn to use manual signs; improved behaviour was also noted. Shortly after, the Core Vocabulary was revised to include both children and adults with severe communication difficulties (including individuals who could hear), and was used in many schools throughout the UK in order to stimulate communication and language.

In the early stages of development, Makaton used only speech and manual signs (without symbols). By 1985, work had begun to include graphic symbols in the Makaton Language Programme and a version including graphic symbols was published in 1986. The Core Vocabulary was revised in 1986 to include additional cultural concepts.

The Makaton Vocabulary Development Project (MVDP) was founded in 1976 by Margaret Walker, who worked in a voluntary capacity as director until her retirement in October 2008.  The first Makaton training workshop was held in 1976 and supporting resources and further training courses were, and continue, to be developed. In 1983 the MVDP became a charitable trust and in 2007 changed its status to become The Makaton Charity.

Use 

The Makaton Language Programme is used extensively across the UK and has been adapted for use in different countries; signs from each country's deaf community are used, along with culturally relevant Makaton symbols. For example, in the United Kingdom, Makaton uses signs from British Sign Language (BSL); the signs are mainly from the London and South East England regional dialect.  Makaton is used extensively throughout the UK, but has also been adapted for use in over 40 countries, including France, Greece, Japan, Kuwait and the Gulf, Russia, South Africa and Switzerland. Using signs from each country's own existing sign language ensures that they reflect each country's unique culture and also provide a bank of further signs if required for use with the Makaton Language Programme.

There has been increased use of Makaton in recent years on national TV and social media. It started in 1991 when the Makaton Charity produced a video/DVD of children's familiar nursery rhymes, signed, spoken and sung by a well-known children's TV presenter, Dave Benson Phillips who had previously used Makaton with poems and rhymes in the Children's BBC show Playdays. The aim was for it to be enjoyed not only by children with developmental disabilities but also by their peers and siblings. Following this major success in 2003 it became a significant part of the BBC's Something Special programmes on the CBeebies programme thread, presented by Justin Fletcher which  has won numerous awards and is now into its eleventh series.

On 16 November 2018, comedian Rob Delaney read a book on the BBC's children's channel CBeebies entirely in Makaton and English; he had used Makaton to communicate with his late son Henry, who was rendered unable to talk after a tracheotomy.

Recognition of Makaton has also impacted on the training of professionals e.g. teachers, speech therapists and medical students and may be a requirement for many professional positions.

Training and resources
The Makaton Charity:
delivers training to over 30,000 parents, carers and professionals
develops and produces a wide range of resources (books, DVDs and computer based resources)
provides a free family advisory service for information, advice and support for parents, family members and professionals working with children.

References

Further reading

 Harrison, D: Virden, F (2011). "Assistant practitioners lead way". British Journal of Healthcare Assistants, 5(8),409. 
 Hooper,

External links
  The Makaton Charity website
 Something Special CBeebies programme to teach all ages Makaton

1970s establishments in the United Kingdom
Augmentative and alternative communication
Deaf culture in the United Kingdom
Sign language
Sign systems
Speech and language pathology